Michael Hans Kater (born July 4, 1937) is a German-Canadian historian of Nazism. He is Distinguished Research Professor Emeritus of history at York University, Toronto, and a fellow of the Royal Society of Canada.

Early life and education
Kater was born in Zittau and moved to Canada in his teens. He graduated from St. Michael's College School in Toronto and earned bachelor's and master's degrees from the University of Toronto. After studying at the universities of Munich and Heidelberg, he completed his PhD in 1966.

Career
After working as a lecturer at the University of Maryland in 1965–66, Kater spent the remainder of his career at York University, where he was an assistant professor from 1967 to 1970, associate professor from 1970 to 1973, professor  from 1973 to 1991, and distinguished research professor from 1991 until becoming emeritus. In 1985–86, he was Jason A. Hannah Visiting Professor of the History of Medicine at McMaster University, and in the 1990s, he was a visiting professor at the University of Toronto.

Kater is also a jazz musician and music historian.

Honors
Kater is a past recipient of fellowships including the Guggenheim Fellowship and the Canada Council Senior Killam Fellowship. He became a Fellow of the Royal Society of Canada in 1988 and in 1990 won the Konrad Adenauer Research Award of the Alexander von Humboldt Foundation. His book Doctors Under Hitler won the Royal Society of Canada's Jason A. Hannah Medal in 1991.

Selected publications

References

Living people
1937 births
20th-century German historians
21st-century German historians
Historians of Nazism
German emigrants to Canada
Fellows of the Royal Society of Canada
Academic staff of York University
University of Toronto alumni
Heidelberg University alumni